Meletie Covaci (1707 – 11 April 1775) was an ethnic Romanian Catholic bishop in the Habsburg monarchy.

Biography

Born in Naousa, Macedonia, of a family of Aromanian origin, Covaci fled to the north of the Danube and was ordained priest on 29 June 1734 by Isaija Antonović, Serbian Orthodox bishop of Arad, and in 1736 converted to the Greek-Catholic Church in a religious ceremony in Oradea, first as a wig of Diosig and then as a fortress of castle. Covaci became a Catholic priest and then a protopope in Diosig and after in Oradea, where he was proposed by the priests to the episcopate.

On 16 September 1748 Pope Benedict XIV named him auxiliary bishop of the Latin Rite Oradea Diocese, in charge of its Romanian Greek-Catholic parishes and was consecrated titular bishop of Tegea in the Byzantine Rite by Manuil Olshavskyi, Vicar Apostolic of Mukacheve. This arrangement did not satisfy the diocese's Romanians, who wanted an independent diocese, a separate cathedral, Romanian schools, their own seminary and monastery, and better pay for their priests and archpriests. Covaci pressed these demands, and in 1756 he asked Empress Maria Theresa, through the Lieutenant Council, to establish "popular schools" in Oradea, Beiuş and Vaşcău. The Empress responded positively to this request as it can be seen in the Sematics of the Latin Diocese of Oradea in 1765, p. 164. However, Covaci only obtained better funding for clergy in the 95 parishes (divided into eight archpriests' districts) extant in 1765.

He died on 11 April 1775 in Oradea.

Notes

External links
 http://www.bru.ro/oradea/lista-episcopilor/ps-meletie-covaci/

1707 births
1775 deaths
Aromanian people
Converts to Eastern Catholicism from Eastern Orthodoxy
Romanian Greek-Catholic bishops
Former Romanian Orthodox Christians
18th-century Roman Catholic titular bishops
18th-century Eastern Catholic bishops